Maxwell "Max" Eaves (born 31 May 1988 in Ascot, Berkshire) is an English athlete specialising in the pole vault.

His personal best jumps are 5.62 metres outdoors (Loughborough 2014) and 5.64 metres indoors (Jablonec 2016).

Competition record

References

External links

1988 births
Living people
English male pole vaulters
Athletes (track and field) at the 2010 Commonwealth Games
Athletes (track and field) at the 2014 Commonwealth Games
Commonwealth Games bronze medallists for England
Commonwealth Games medallists in athletics
People from Ascot, Berkshire
Medallists at the 2010 Commonwealth Games